Tell Sheikh Hamad, also Dur-Katlimmu, is an archeological site in eastern Syria on the lower Khabur River, a tributary of the Euphrates.

Chalcolithic Period

The site of Tell Sheikh Hamad was occupied from the Late Chalcolithic period (Late Neolithic, M4), when it was a small settlement.

Mitanni Period
In the Late Bronze Age, the region surrounding Dur-Katlimmu was part of the Mitanni Empire and the kingdom of Hanigalbat. Following the assassination of great king Tushratta, the Mitanni Empire struggled with civil war and outside pressure until it fell. A quantity of Hittite potter was found at the site.

Assyrian Period

During the reign of Shalmaneser 
The city was established as the capital of a new Assyrian province by Shalmaneser I (r. 1263-34 B.C.) following the collapse of the Mitanni Empire. He put Ibašši-ilī son of Adad-nirari I, his brother, as the founder of the dynasty on the royal throne. Dur-Katlimmu (Tell Seh Hamad) became the capital of this kingdom on the lower Habur river. The ruler bore the title 'grand vizier' (sakallu rabi'u) and 'king of the land of Hanigalbat' (sar mat Hanigalbat).

End of the Assyrian Empire 
During the fall of the Assyrian Empire (911-605 BC), sections of the Assyrian army retreated to the western corner of Assyria after the fall of Nineveh, Harran and Carchemish, and a number of Assyrian imperial records survive between 604 BC and 599 BC in and around Dur-Katlimmu, and so it is possible that remnants of the Assyrian administration and army still continued to hold out in the region for a few years.

After the fall of the Assyrian Empire 
After the fall of the Assyrian Empire, Dur-Katlimmu became one of the many Near- and Middle-Eastern cities called Magdalu/Magdala/Migdal/Makdala/Majdal, all of which are simply Semitic language toponyms meaning "fortified elevation, tower".

Excavations
In 1878 Hormuzd Rassam dug some test trenches and removed a stele fragment. The site was excavated between 1978 and 2010, led by Hartmut Kühne .

Excavations have recovered 550 cuneiform Akkadian and 40 Aramaic texts belonging to a senior guard of Ashurbanipal.

In July 2020, French archaeologists excavated Tell Sheikh Hamad during the Syrian Civil War, according to the Anadolu Agency.

See also
Cities of the ancient Near East

References

External links
Basalt stela of Adad-Nirari III - British Museum

Archaeological sites in Deir ez-Zor Governorate